Granstudio is a mobility research and design studio in Turin, Italy. It was founded in 2011 by Lowie Vermeersch, a Flemish designer and former Design Director at Pininfarina. As a design consultancy, the studio defines, designs, and develops cars and other mobility means for a variety of international companies.

Vehicles designed by Granstudio 
 Lightyear 0 (2022)
 Drako Motors Drako GTE (2019)
 Massey Ferguson NEXT concept (2019)
 Mobjects autonomous urban furniture (2019)
 BAIC Suit concept (2018)
 Senova D70/Zhidao (2018)
 Dallara Stradale (2017)
 BAIC Senova Offspace concept (2016)
 Senova D70 Offspace Concept (2016)
 Chery Tiggo 7 (2016)
 Cowin X3 (2016)
 Scuderia Cameron Glickenhaus SCG 003 (2015)
 Cowin i-CX concept (2014)
 Chery TX concept (2012)
 Cowin Xuandu (2021)

References

External links 
 website
 news

Companies based in Turin
Companies established in 2011